Nippani is one of the 224 constituencies in the Karnataka Legislative Assembly of Karnataka a south state of India. It is a segment of Chikkodi Lok Sabha constituency.

Members of Vidhan Sabha

Mysore State
 1957: Balvant Dattoba Naik, (Independent / Maharashtra Ekikaran Samiti (MES) Activist)
 1962: Govind Krishna Manavi, Maharashtra Ekikaran Samiti (MES)
 1967: Govind Krishna Manavi, (IND / MES) 
 1972: K. R. Vithalrao, Indian National Congress

Karnataka State
 1978: Balavant Gopal Chavan,  (Independent / MES) 
 1983: Balasaheb Dattaji Shinde, (Independent / MES) 
 1985: Veerkumar Appaso Patil, Indian National Congress
 1989: Subhash Shridhar Joshi, Janata Dal
 1994: Subhash Shridhar Joshi, Janata Dal
 1999: Kakasaheb Pandurang Patil, Indian National Congress
 2004: Kakasaheb Pandurang Patil, Indian National Congress
 2008: Kakasaheb Pandurang Patil, Indian National Congress
 2013: Shashikala Annasaheb Jolle, Bharatiya Janata Party
 2018: Shashikala Annasaheb Jolle, Bharatiya Janata Party

Election Results

2018 assembly elections

2013 Vidhan Sabha
 Shashikala Jolle (BJP) : 81,860 votes
 Kakaso Pandurang Patil (INC) : 63198

1983 Vidhan Sabha Elections
 Balasaheb Dattaji Shinde (IND / MES) : 21,658 votes  
 Joshi Subhash Shridhar (IND) : 	18043

1962 Election
 Govind Krishna Manavi (MES) : 27,280 votes
 Balarishna Keshav Patwardhan (INC) :	9273

1957 Election
 Naik, Balvant Dattoba (IND / MES) : 26,069 votes  
 Patil Pandurang Parashram (INC) : 7,737

See also
 Belagavi district
 Chikkodi Lok Sabha constituency
 List of constituencies of Karnataka Legislative Assembly

References

 

Assembly constituencies of Karnataka
Belagavi district